Atractaspis congica, commonly known as the Congo burrowing asp, is a species of venomous snake in the family Atractaspididae. It is found in Africa.

Description
Uniformly dark brown or black both dorsally and ventrally. Snout very short and rounded. Portion of rostral visible from above about half as long as its distance from the frontal. Smooth dorsal scales in 19 or 23 rows. Ventrals 200–230; anal divided; subcaudals 19–23, a few of the anterior entire, the remainder in two rows.

Subspecies
Three subspecies are recognized.

 Atractaspis congica congica W. Peters, 1877
 Atractaspis congica leleupi Laurent, 1950
 Atractaspis congica orientalis Laurent, 1945

References

Lamprophiidae
Reptiles described in 1877
Taxa named by Wilhelm Peters